Leandro José de Flores (1776–1839) was a Spanish priest and historian.  In his hometown is known as Father Flores.

Historiographical works
News "collación" of San Roque Sevilla, Royal Press, 1817.
Historical Memoirs of the town of Alcalá de Guadaíra, Sevilla, Press of D. Mariano Caro, 1833–1834.

1776 births
1839 deaths
People from Seville (comarca)